Christian Brüller (since 1938 Kristjan Prüller; 23 June 1877 Sulustvere, Kurista Parish, Kreis Fellin (Viljandi) – 14 May 1950 Põltsamaa) was an Estonian politician. He was a member of Estonian Constituent Assembly. He was a member of the assembly since 28 September 1920. He replaced Heinrich Tats.

References

1877 births
1950 deaths
People from Põltsamaa Parish
People from Kreis Fellin
Farmers' Assemblies politicians
Members of the Estonian Constituent Assembly